The America Zone was one of the two regional zones of the 1934 International Lawn Tennis Challenge.

5 teams entered the America Zone: 3 teams competed in the North & Central America Zone, while 2 teams competed in the South America Zone. The winner of each sub-zone would play against each other to determine who moved to the Inter-Zonal Final to compete against the winner of the Europe Zone.

The United States defeated Mexico in the North & Central America Zone final and received a walkover into the Inter-Zonal Final after both Brazil and Peru, the only competing teams in the South America Zone, withdrew.

North & Central America Zone

Draw

Semifinals

United States vs. Canada

Final

United States vs. Mexico

South America Zone

Draw

Americas Inter-Zonal Final

United States vs. Brazil
United States defeated Brazil by walkover.

References

External links
Davis Cup official website

Davis Cup Americas Zone
America Zone
International Lawn Tennis Challenge